are Japanese mountain ascetic hermits. They are generally part of the syncretic  religion, which includes Tantric Buddhist, Shinto, and Japanese Taoist elements.

According to author Frederik L. Schodt:

Appearance of Yamabushi 

Yamabushi usually wear and bring the following cloths and items:
 Yuigesa
 Kyahan which guard both their feet.
 Tokin which is a small hat.
 Shakujō, a metal rod which they hold in hand.
 Oi (tool), backpack.
 Horagai an instrument made of conch shell, which they blow.

See also
 Cunning folk
 Mount Ōfuna
 Shaolin Monastery
 Yama-bito

Further reading

References

Ascetics
Hermits
Mysticism
Religious occupations
Japanese warriors
Japanese words and phrases